Mosaic: World News from The Middle East was a daily news program offered by the free American satellite channel, LinkTV. "Mosaic" featured selections from television news programs produced by broadcast outlets throughout the Middle East. The news reports were presented unedited, translated into English when necessary.  The "Mosaic" series was created by Stephen Olsson and Kim Spencer. Its founding producer was Jamal Dajani, a Palestinian American and it was co-produced by David Michaelis, an Israeli Jew. From late 2010 until 2013, the daily "Mosaic" program was co-produced by Lara Bitar and Abdullah Edwan.

Awards
It won a Peabody Award in 2004.

Distribution
Mosaic was broadcast on Link TV, a free informational channel available on DirecTV, Dish Network and some US cable TV systems; and is archived by the Internet Archive, from which it can be viewed.

Sources
Mosaic broadcast news programs from Al Jazeera, Nile TV (Egypt), IRIB 2 (Iran), Al-Alam News Network (Iran), Iraq State Television (defunct since the US war in Iraq. Replaced by Al-Iraqiyah), Israel Broadcasting Authority: Arabic Channel (Israel), Jordan Satellite TV (Jordan), Future TV (Lebanon), National Broadcasting Network Lebanon), 2M-TV (Morocco), Palestinian Satellite Channel (Palestinian territories), Syria Satellite TV (Syria), Yemen State Television (Yemen), Abu Dhabi Television (UAE), Dubai Television (UAE), Arab News Network (Based in London, United Kingdom), Al-Jazeera, Al-Arabiya,  Al-Manar (Hezbollah's TV station. Dropped from Mosaic in 2005.)

Funding
Mosaic was supported by the William and Flora Hewlett Foundation, the John S. and James L. Knight Foundation, the Firedoll Foundation, and Link TV viewers.

Controversy
In January 2004, and again in January 2005, disputes arose over the airing of Mosaic on NewTV,  the Public-access television cable TV channel of Newton, Massachusetts.  Opponents of its airing argued that the program provides a distorted view of Arab broadcasts, and a venue for antisemitism, anti-Americanism, and "terrorist propaganda".  Supporters of the program, while conceding that the broadcasts may on occasion contain "anti-Semitic and anti-American content", argued that they "give Americans a diverse array of information about how the country is portrayed in the Middle East", and that their broadcast is a free speech issue.

Mosaic has also been criticized by the Committee for Accuracy in Middle East Reporting in America, which claims it "whitewashes terrorism and promotes extremism".

References

External links
 LinkTV site for Mosaic
 Mosaic stream archive
 Mosaic video archive at the Internet Archive Streaming video archive available.
 Mosaic Intelligence Report
 Jamal Dajani Home Page
 The New York Times

Arab mass media
Middle East
2004 American television series debuts
2000s American television news shows
2010s American television news shows
2020s American television news shows
Peabody Award-winning television programs